Alfred Hale (24 January 1906 – December 1972), known as Alf or Pally Hale, was an English professional footballer who made 205 appearances in the Football League playing for Lincoln City, Luton Town and Halifax Town. He played as an outside left. He also played for Welsh League club Llanelly and in non-league football in the Sheffield area. He played at left back or left half.

Life and career
Hale was born in Kiveton Park, Yorkshire, and played football for his local club before joining Football League Third Division North club Lincoln City. He made his debut in September 1925, and over the next five seasons made 167 appearances in league and FA Cup matches, contributing to their runners-up finish in 1927–28. He moved into the Southern Section with Luton Town in the 1930 close season, for whom he played just 22 league matches.

He then signed for club Llanelly, who were playing both in the Southern League and in the Welsh League, which they won in 1932–33. In March 1933, the Daily Mirror reported that Llanelly had received lucrative offers for numerous players, including Hale, but were not allowing them to leave because they hoped to gain admission to the Football League for the next season. They failed in this, and Hale returned to the Third Division North with Halifax Town in 1934. He finished his career back in non-league football with Dinnington Athletic.

Hale died in 1972 at the age of 66.

References

1906 births
1972 deaths
People from Kiveton Park
English footballers
Association football wing halves
Association football fullbacks
Kiveton Park F.C. players
Lincoln City F.C. players
Luton Town F.C. players
Llanelli Town A.F.C. players
Halifax Town A.F.C. players
English Football League players
Southern Football League players
Dinnington Athletic F.C. players
Sportspeople from Yorkshire